Amphidromus globonevilli is a species of air-breathing land snail, a terrestrial pulmonate gastropod mollusk in the family Camaenidae.

Distribution
Distribution of Amphidromus principalis include Nakhon Si Thammarat Province in Thailand.

Description

References

External links 

principalis
Gastropods described in 2015